Tom and Jerry in War of the Whiskers is a fighting video game developed by VIS Entertainment, published by NewKidCo for PlayStation 2, GameCube, and Xbox. It is the sequel to the 3D cartoon fighting video game Tom and Jerry in Fists of Furry for Nintendo 64 and Microsoft Windows. It allows up to four players to play simultaneously. It is the only NewKidCo game and the only MGM's Tom and Jerry game, released to receive a T rating. The PlayStation 2 version was released in all major regions, and the GameCube and Xbox versions were only released in North America. The game received mixed reviews from critics, with Metacritic scores of 63/100, 64/100, and 50/100 on PlayStation 2, GameCube, and Xbox, respectively.

Gameplay

War of the Whiskers is a four player arena(show) fighting game. The objective is to defeat an opponent in a set amount of time and rounds. There are three types of gameplay. First is Challenge mode, where the opponents are the enemies of the character chosen from classic Tom and Jerry cartoons. The final boss is either Monster Jerry, a bigger and scary mutated Jerry, or Robot Cat, one of Tom's creations. Another mode is Versus, where a basic one-on-one fight is held. The last is Tag Battle, where a player works alone or with a friend to fight two enemies.

The four modes of play are single player, versus, tag team, and team play. New characters are unlocked if the player wins against the computer. Characters include Tom, Jerry, Butch, Spike, Tyke, Robot Cat, Eagle, Lion, Nibbles, Monster Jerry, and Duckling, who use more than 75 weapons to beat each other with. Costumes are also unlocked, allowing specific characters to have more attire. Twelve destructible environments include a kitchen, beach, snowy winter, cruise ship, junk yard, unstable construction site, Italian market, haunted house, mad scientist lab, western town, castle, Hell, and a boxing arena.

Development
Tom and Jerry in War of the Whiskers was developed by VIS Entertainment. It was published by NewKidCo in North America and Ubisoft Entertainment in Europe. It is a sequel to Tom and Jerry in Fists of Furry. The game was originally slated to the first quarter of 2002, but was delayed until the third quarter. It was first released for PlayStation 2 on October 22, 2002 in North America, with later PlayStation 2 releases in other regions. It was also released on GameCube and Xbox only in North America on November 25, 2003.

All voices in the game were provided by Alan Marriott (Jerry, Tyke, Lion, Nibbles, and Duckling) and Marc Silk (Tom, Butch, Spike, Eagle, Robot Cat, and Monster Jerry).

Reception 

Tom and Jerry in War of the Whiskers received "mixed or average" reviews on all platforms, according to review aggregator Metacritic.

In Japan, where the PlayStation 2 version was ported and published by Success on January 29, 2004, Famitsu gave it a score of two sixes, one five, and one four for a total of 21 out of 40.

References

External links
 

2002 video games
Fighting games
GameCube games
PlayStation 2 games
Ubisoft games
Success (company) games
Video games based on Tom and Jerry
Video games developed in the United Kingdom
Video games based on animated television series
Xbox games
Cartoon Network video games
NewKidCo games
Multiplayer and single-player video games
VIS Entertainment games